is Mai Kuraki's twenty-ninth single, released on July 9, 2008. It was released in two formats: limited CD+DVD edition and regular edition. "Ichibyōgoto ni Love for You" served as opening theme for the Meitantei Conan anime series for episodes 505-514 broadcast on Nihon TV. It is Kuraki's ninth contribution to the series.

Track listing

Charts

Oricon Sales Chart

Billboard Japan Sales Chart

External links

2008 singles
2008 songs
Mai Kuraki songs
Case Closed songs
Song recordings produced by Daiko Nagato